Conrad of Hohenstaufen may refer to:
Conrad III of Germany (died 1152)
Conrad, Count Palatine of the Rhine (died 1195)
Conrad II, Duke of Swabia (died 1196)
Conrad IV of Germany (died 1254)
Conradin (died 1268)